Do Kum-bong (August 27, 1930 – June 3, 2009) was a South Korean actress whose fame peaked in the 1950s and 1960s. She starred in more than 283 films.

Filmography

Awards 
 1963 2nd Grand Bell Awards : Best Actress for New Wife (Saedaek)
 1972 11th Grand Bell Awards : Best Supporting Actress for When a little dream blooms...
 1974 13th Grand Bell Awards : Best Supporting Actress for The Earth

References

External links 
 
 

1930 births
2009 deaths
People from Incheon
South Korean film actresses